The following is a list of notable deaths in October 2005.

Entries for each day are listed alphabetically by surname. A typical entry lists information in the following sequence:
 Name, age, country of citizenship at birth, subsequent country of citizenship (if applicable), reason for notability, cause of death (if known), and reference.

October 2005

1
David Frederick Case, 73, British audiobook narrator, throat cancer.
Robert Hanson, 85, American aviator, last-surviving crew-member of the "Memphis Belle".
Peter Hubbard-Miles, 78, British politician.
Harlo Jones, 81, Canadian World War II bomber pilot, stroke.
Sir Edwin Manton, 96, English businessman and art collector.
Renzo Nostini, 91, Italian Olympic fencer.
Paul Pena, 55, American blues guitarist and songwriter, complications of diabetes and pancreatitis.

2
Bud Black, 73, American baseball player.
Hamilton Camp, 70, British-American singer and actor (Heaven Can Wait, The Smurfs, DuckTales), heart attack.
Bert Eriksson, 74, Belgian political activist.
Patrick Kelly, 61, American former Major League Baseball All-Star, heart attack.
Alan Rees, 64, Welsh Roman Catholic monk, organist and composer.
Nipsey Russell, 80, American comedian, poet and actor, cancer.
August Wilson, 60, American playwright (Fences, Ma Rainey's Black Bottom, The Piano Lesson), liver cancer.

3
Ronnie Barker, 76, British actor and writer (The Two Ronnies, Porridge, Open All Hours).
Seymour Boardman, 83, American artist.
Emilinha Borba, 82, Brazilian singer and actress.
Alastair G. W. Cameron, 80, Canadian-born American astrophysicist, responsible for Giant Impact Theory of Lunar Creation and pioneer work on Stellar nucleosynthesis, heart failure.
Dorothy Marion Campbell, 94, English potter.
Sir Peter Crill, 80, Jersey lawyer and politician, Bailiff of Jersey (1986–1995).
Mario Encarnación, 30, Dominican baseball player.
Nurettin Ersin, 86–87, Turkish army general.
Colin McDonald, 57, New Zealand cricketer.
David Cohen, 90, American politician, heart failure.
Francesco (Franco) Scoglio, 64, Italian soccer trainer.
David Zenoff, 89, American former Nevada Supreme Court Justice, perhaps most known for performing the marriage of Elvis Presley.

4
John Falloon, 63, New Zealand politician, former New Zealand Cabinet minister.
Mike Gibbins, 56, Welsh drummer (Badfinger).
Jim Gray, 47, Northern Irish loyalist, murdered.
Stanley K. Hathaway, 81, American politician, former Republican Governor of Wyoming, (1967–1975), Secretary of the Interior (1975).
Vakhtang Jordania, 62, Georgian (formerly Soviet) conductor, cancer.
Harold Leventhal, 86, American folk music promoter.
Andrew Raven, 46, British conservationist, non-Hodgkin lymphoma.
William J. Ruane, 79, American philanthropist and financier, lung cancer.
André Waterkeyn, 88, Belgian engineer and hockey player.

5
John Arnup, 94, Canadian jurist.
Don Alvaro Domecq y Diez, 88, Spanish aristocrat.
Maura Murphy, 77, Irish author.
John van Hengel, 83, American entrepreneur, founder of America's Second Harvest, food bank pioneer.

6
Warren Benson, 81, American composer.
Harry Bugin, 76, American actor (Barton Fink, The Big Lebowski, The Hudsucker Proxy).
Ray Bumatai, 52, American comedian and actor (Rocket Power), brain cancer.
Ettore Cunial, 99, Italian prelate, world's oldest Roman Catholic bishop.
Horst Floth, 71, German bobsledder, world champion and Olympic silver medallist.
Louise Gore, 80, American Republican politician from Maryland, cancer.
Ronald Ray Howard, 32, American convicted murderer, executed in Texas.

7
David Birnie, 54, Australian serial killer.
Tracey Miller, 51, American radio host, pioneer of women's sports broadcasting, brain cancer.
Richard Stone Reeves, 85, American equestrian portraitist.
Charles Rocket, 56, American actor and comedian (Saturday Night Live, Dumb and Dumber, Hocus Pocus), suicide.

8
Robert O. Beers, 89, American politician, member of the Pennsylvania State Senate.
Alfred Goldie, 84, English mathematician.
Janet Elizabeth Macgregor, 85, Scottish physician and cytologist, cerebrovascular disease.
Sir Harry Pitt, 91, British mathematician.
Anatoly Shapiro, 92, Ukrainian-born Soviet soldier.

9
Clóvis Bornay, 89, Brazilian carnival designer and museum curator, cardiac arrest.
Tom Cheek, 66, American sportscaster, longtime Toronto Blue Jays play-by-play announcer, brain cancer.
Madurai N. Krishnan, 76, Indian musician.
Louis Nye, 92, American comedian, lung cancer.
LeRoy Whitfield, 36, African-American writer and AIDS activist, complications of AIDS.
Shams Ul Huda Shams, 66, Afghan politician, President of Afghan Mellat Party and nationalist leader.

10
Angelo Argea, 75, Greek longtime caddy for legendary golfer Jack Nicklaus, liver cancer.
Aivaras Balzekas, 23, Lithuanian tennis player, car accident.
Wayne C. Booth, 84, American professor, literary critic, and rhetorician, complications of dementia.
Nick Hawkins, 40, English electric guitarist with Big Audio Dynamite, heart attack.
Attila İlhan, 80, Turkish poet and writer.
Milton Obote, 80, Ugandan political leader, former president of Uganda.

11
Sergio Citti, 72, Italian screenwriter and film director, frequent collaborator with Pier Paolo Pasolini; heart attack.
Carla Emery DeLong, 66, American proponent of organic farming and the homesteading movement; author of The Encyclopedia of Country Living, hypotension.
Jan Holden, 74, British actress, (The Cheaters).
Joseph Neri, 91, French cyclist.
Arthur Seldon, 89, British libertarian economist.
Edward Szczepanik, 90, Polish economist and former and last Prime Minister of the Polish Government in Exile.
Cor Veldhoen, 66, Dutch soccer player (Feyenoord and national team).

12
Zhang Bairen, 90, Chinese underground Roman Catholic bishop, heart disease.
Reed Bullen, 98, American politician, broadcaster and Mormon leader.
Sir Robert Foster, 91, British colonial officer, (Governor of Fiji).
Frank Galbally, 82, Australian lawyer.
Ghazi Kanaan, 63, Syrian Interior Minister, officially suicide (though suspicious).
Baker Knight, 72, American songwriter ("Lonesome Town").
David E. McGiffert, 79, American lawyer and Defense Department official, heart failure.
C. Delores Tucker, 78, American politician, civil rights activist and former Pennsylvania Secretary of State.
Jack White, 63, American reporter.
Aloysius John Wycislo, 97, American prelate, Bishop Emeritus of Green Bay, Wisconsin.

13
Emile Capouya, 80, American publisher, author, and literary critic.
István Eörsi, 74, Hungarian left-wing intellectual, leukemia.
Vivian Malone Jones, 63, American civil rights pioneer, stroke.
Volker Tulzer, 65, Austrian Olympic athlete.
Wayne Weiler, 70, American racecar driver.

14
Edmund Bacon, 95, American urban planner.
Ian Breakwell, 62, British artist in multiple mediums.
Ralph Graham, 95, American sportsman.
Oleg Lundstrem, 89, Russian jazz musician.
Joke Waller-Hunter, 58, Dutch senior United Nations official.

15
Leo Bogart, 84, American sociologist, babesiosis.
Giuseppe Caprio, 90, Italian cardinal of the Roman Catholic Church.
Jason Collier, 28, American Atlanta Hawks basketball player, heart abnormality.
Voit Gilmore, 87, American Democratic politician, former North Carolina state Senator and Kennedy Administration official, complications of Parkinson's disease.
Penn Kemble, 64, American political activist.
Rik Van Nutter, 75, American actor.
Mildred Shay, 94, American actress.
Al Widmar, 80, American former Major League Baseball pitcher and pitching coach, colon cancer.
Matti Wuori, 60, Finnish advocate and politician, cancer.

16
Jack Carpenter, 82, American football player.
Elmer Dresslar, Jr., 80, American voice actor and vocalist, voice of the Jolly Green Giant, cancer.
Ursula Howells, 83, British character actress (The Forsyte Saga).
Sir John Johnston, 87, British diplomat.
Alvin M. Josephy, Jr., 90, American history professor, expert on Native American history.
John Larch, 91, American character actor.
Eugene "Porky" Lee, 71, American child actor, lung cancer.
Barrington Moore, Jr., 92, American sociologist.
Børge Mortensen, 83, Danish Olympic cyclist.
David Reilly, 34, American lead singer/songwriter/musician of American rock band God Lives Underwater.

17
Tom Gill, 92, American comic book artist (The Lone Ranger).
Ba Jin, 100, Chinese writer, cancer and Parkinson's disease.
Antal Moldrich, 71, Hungarian Olympic modern pentathlete.
Donald Kofi Tucker, 67, American civil rights activist and New Jersey General Assemblyman, complications of diabetes.
Charlie Yates, 92, American amateur golfer.

18
William Evan Allan, 106, Australian soldier, last Australian World War I veteran (active service), sailor.
Carlos António Gomes, 73, Portuguese goalkeeper with Sporting Lisbon and Portugal's national team in the 1950s and 1960s.
Johnny Haynes, 71, English footballer, car accident.
Bill King, 78, American sports broadcaster.
Hal Lebovitz, 89, American Baseball Hall of Fame sportswriter, cancer.
Phil Starr, 72, British gay cabaret singer and comedian.
Alexander Nikolaevich Yakovlev, 81, Russian politician and architect of perestroika.

19
Bob Carpenter, 87, American baseball player.
Dallas Cook, 23, American trombone player for Suburban Legends, hit-and-run motorcycle accident.
Ormond McGill, 92, American Dean of American Hypnotists, stage hypnotist, hypnotherapist, and teacher.
Jim Morgan, 63, Australian rugby league footballer.
Luis Adolfo Siles, 80, Bolivian politician, former President of Bolivia, heart attack.

20
Jean-Michel Folon, 71, Belgian artist.
Michael Gill, 81, British television producer, Alzheimer's disease.
Shirley Horn, 71, African-American jazz singer, complications of diabetes.
André van der Louw, 72, Dutch politician, cancer.
Otto Luedeke, 89, American Olympic cyclist.
Endon Mahmood, 64, Malaysian Prime Minister's wife, breast cancer.
Luis L. Ramirez, 42, American convicted murderer, executed in Texas.
Besim Sahatçiu, 70, Albanian film and theatre director.
Saadoun Sughaiyer al-Janabi, Iraqi defense lawyer in Saddam Hussein's trial, murdered by unknown assailants in Baghdad.
Willie Sojourner, 57, American basketball player.
Eva Švankmajerová, 65, Czech surrealistic painter.

21
Karin Adelmund, 56, Dutch politician.
Robert E. Badham, 76, American politician, former Republican United States Representative from California, heart attack.
Marshall Clagett, 89, American historian of science, Professor Emeritus at Princeton University's Institute for Advanced Study.
Oscar Giacché, 82, Argentine Olympic cyclist.
John Lesinski Jr., 90, American politician, U.S. Representative from Michigan (1951–1965).
Sir Nigel Mobbs, 68, British Lord Lieutenant of Buckinghamshire.
Rabbi Herman N. Neuberger, 87, German-born leader and president of Ner Israel Rabbinical College for over 50 years.
Lou Rossini, 84, American former basketball coach of New York University, Alzheimer's disease.

22
Tony Adams, 53, Irish-born film and stage producer (The Pink Panther) (Victor Victoria).
George T. Alexander, 34, American soldier, 2,000th U.S. military death in Iraq.
Arman, (né Armand Pierre Fernandez), 76, French-born sculptor, cancer.
Ted Bonda, 88, American former owner of the Cleveland Indians Major League Baseball team, Alzheimer's disease.
Francisco Alejandro Gutierrez, 43, Cuban-born musician and lead singer of Captain Jack under his stage name "Frankie Gee", cerebral haemorrhage.
Liam Lawlor, 61, Irish Fianna Fáil Teachta Dála (TD), whose involvement in land rezoning and political corruption was the subject of the Flood Tribunal, car accident in Moscow.
Reggie Lisowski, 79, American professional wrestler known as "The Crusher", brain tumor.
Eleanor Saukerson, 83, American politician, member of the South Dakota Senate.

23
Harry Dalton, 77, American former Major League Baseball general manager with the Baltimore Orioles, Milwaukee Brewers, and California Angels, Parkinson's disease.
Simon Hobart, 41, British club promoter.
William Hootkins, 57, American actor (Star Wars, Batman, Raiders of the Lost Ark), pancreatic cancer.
Reginald R. Myers, 85, United States Marine Corps officer and recipient of the Medal of Honor.
John S. Monagan, 93, American politician, former Democratic United States Representative from Connecticut, heart failure.
John Muth, 75, American economist.
Stella Obasanjo, 59, Nigerian First Lady, wife of Nigerian president Olusegun Obasanjo, complications from surgery.
Yon Hyong-muk, 73, North Korean politician, former Prime Minister of North Korea, pancreatic cancer.

24
Ricardo Brinzoni, 60, Argentine military officer, Lieutenant General of the Argentine Army and former Army chief-of-staff, pancreatic cancer.
Howie Carl, 67, American basketball player.
Ted Dushinski, 61, Canadian former defensive back for the Canadian Football Leagues Saskatchewan Roughriders, lung cancer.
Mokarrameh Ghanbari, 77, Iranian painter.
José Azcona del Hoyo, 78, Honduran politician, President of Honduras (1986–1990).
Denis Lindbohm, 78, Swedish science fiction author.
Rosa Parks, 92, African-American civil rights pioneer, "founding symbol of the Civil Rights Movement".
Edward R. Roybal, 89, Mexican-American former Democratic United States Representative from California, pneumonia.
Frank Wilson, 81, Australian actor, singer, TV celebrity.
Katherine Young, 104, Chinese-born American centenarian, world's oldest Internet user.

25
Zarina Baloch, 70, Pakistani folk singer.
Oswald Hanfling, 77, German philosopher.
Enid A. Haupt, 99, American philanthropist.
Barbara Keogh, 76, British actress.
Wellington Mara, 89, American New York Giants co-owner, lymphoma.
Nirmal Verma, 76, Indian author and literary critic, heart attack.
Willie Williams, 49, American convicted murderer, executed in Ohio.

26
Leslie Clifford Bateman, 90, British rubber expert.
Marlin Gray, 38, American convicted murderer, executed in Missouri.
Michael Kilian, 66, American author and comics writer (Dick Tracy), liver failure.
Emil Kyulev, 48, Bulgarian banker, one of the richest men in Bulgaria, murdered in Sofia.
Keith Parkinson, 47, American fantasy and science-fiction artist and illustrator.
Sir Richard Southwood, 74, British biologist.
George Swindin, 90, English football goalkeeper and manager (Arsenal and Cardiff City).
Rong Yiren, 89, Chinese politician, former Vice President of the People's Republic of China.

27
Jozef Bomba, 66, Slovak footballer.
Jerry Cooke, 84, American photographer.
Norman Ellis, 92, New Zealand cricketer (Auckland).
Georges Guingouin, 92, French Communist Party militant, one of the most famous French resistants.
Jean-Claude Irvoas, 56, French employee, murder.
Kurt Jarasinski, 66, German Olympic equestrian gold medalist.
Jun Papa, 60, Filipino basketball player.
Grimes Poznikov, 59, American San Francisco street performer, alcohol poisoning.

28
Peter Beet, 68, British railway preservation pioneer.
Eugene K. Bird, 79, American longtime Spandau guard of Rudolf Hess.
Bob Broeg, 87, American Hall of Fame baseball sports writer, pneumonia.
Raymond Hains, 78, French artist.
Tony Jackson, 62, American professional basketball player, former St. John's basketball standout.
Tahsin Ozguc, 89, Turkish archaeologist.
Fernando Quejas, 83, Cape Verdean singer and musician.
Paul Reynard, 78, French-born painter, lung cancer.
Richard Smalley, 62, American Nobel Prize-winning chemist, co-discoverer of fullerenes.
Ljuba Tadić, 76, Serbian actor.

29
Fernando Alegría, 87, Chilean poet.
H. K. L. Bhagat, 84, Indian politician.
Marianne Bluger, 60, Canadian poet.
Lloyd Bochner, 81, Canadian actor (Dynasty, Point Blank, Batman: The Animated Series), cancer.
Ian Bush, 22, Canadian shooting victim.
Mor Julius Yeshu Cicek, 63, Turkish prelate, highest-ranking Syriac Orthodox Church priest in Europe.
Roger Ghyselinck, 81, Belgian cyclist.
Valery Kokov, 64, Russian politician, former President of Kabardino-Balkaria, cancer.
Albert Parker, 78, English footballer.

30
Bob Allen, 91, American baseball pitcher.
David Bazay, 66, English CBC ombudsman and veteran journalist.
Gordon A. Craig, 91, American historian, congestive heart failure.
John N. Erlenborn, 78, American lawyer and former Republican U.S. Representative from Illinois, Lewy body disease.
Tetsuo Hamuro, 88, Japanese 1936 Olympics gold-medal winner in swimming.
Kyle Lake, 33, American pastor at the University Baptist Church in Waco, Texas, electrocuted by microphone during a baptism service.
Al López, 97, American baseball manager (Chicago White Sox) and member of the Baseball Hall of Fame.
Joseph Owens, 97, Canadian Roman Catholic priest and philosopher.
Emiliano Zuleta, 93, Colombian vallenato musician, respiratory disease.

31
Hal O. Anger, 85, American biophysicist, pioneer of nuclear medicine, inventor of gamma ray camera.
William O. Baker, 90, American scientist and former Bell Labs president, respiratory failure.
Arthur Gary, 91, American radio and television announcer, leukemia.
Evert Hingst, 35, Dutch lawyer, allegedly involved in organized crime, shot.
Amrita Pritam, 86, Indian poet and writer.
P. Leela, 72, Indian film playback singer.
Mary Wimbush, 81, British actress (The Archers).
Volma Overton, 81, American Activist.

References 

2005-10
 10